The Edmonton International Fringe Festival is an annual arts festival held every August in Edmonton, Alberta, Canada. Produced by the Fringe Theatre Adventures (FTA), it is the oldest and largest fringe theatre festival in North America (based on ticket sales). The Edmonton Fringe is a founding member of the Canadian Association of Fringe Festivals.

In 2014, 118,280 tickets were sold, up from 117,000 in 2013. The 2014 event had over 210 shows and 1,600 performances, with an estimated outdoor site attendance of 665,750. In 2016, the attendance rate reached a record-breaking high of 850,000+ attendees. In 2017 there was a record-breaking 130,000 tickets sold and $1.2 million in box office sales during the festival, which held performances from over 1,500 artists in 220 shows.

History
In 1982, Chinook Theatre's artistic director Brian Paisley received $50,000 from Edmonton's Summerfest to put together "A Fringe Theatre Event" in Edmonton's Old Strathcona District. Inspired by the Edinburgh Festival Fringe, Scotland, the Edmonton Fringe (the first in North America) offered 200 live performances in five theatre venues. The 2020 Edmonton International Fringe Festival (scheduled for August 13 to 23, 2020) was cancelled due to the COVID-19 pandemic, the only time the festival has been cancelled since its inception.

Venues
The festival itself takes place in Old Strathcona which has a number of permanent theatres (including the Westbury Theatre and Nordic Studio Theatre in the ATB Financial Arts Barns, the Walterdale Playhouse, the Varscona Theatre, the Roxy on Whyte, and the Princess Theatre) and a number of other venues which are converted by FTA or independent artists into temporary theatre venues.  During the festival, the streets and alleys of the neighbourhood are also filled with street performers and masked or costumed actors promoting their plays.

Unlike the Edinburgh Festivals, where artists are responsible for finding and running their own venues, the Edmonton Fringe implements a system in which for a relatively low application fee, the festival provides artists with a venue, a set number of performances, two technicians, and front-of-house and ticketing services and general festival marketing. Artists may also arrange for their own performance space independently as a "Bring Your Own Venue" or BYOV, similar to the Edinburgh Fringe model.

Performers

Admittance for performers to the festival is determined by application to a lottery held each November. The emphasis is on theatre, but performances can and do feature almost every form of art and entertainment. In addition to the hundreds of national and international artists who travel from around the world to bring their shows to the Edmonton Fringe, there are also hundreds of local performers who participate each year. Many of the local performers have been with the festival since the early years. Performers such as Ken Brown, local magician Ron Pearson, Rapid Fire Theatre, Die-Nasty, Jan Randall Teatro la Quindicina, Panties Productions, Mump and Smoot, The Wombats, Ribbit Productions, The Dan Show, Nikolai, Ryan Stock of Insane Entertainment, Three Dead Trolls in a Baggie and Tim Waterson have appeared at the festival regularly.

Notes

References

External links
 
 An article on Canadian fringe theatre festivals from The Canadian Encyclopedia

Festivals in Edmonton
Fringe festivals in Canada
Theatre festivals in Alberta
Theatre in Edmonton
Festivals established in 1982
1982 establishments in Alberta